Breaking News is an American drama television series about the fictional Milwaukee-based 24-hour cable news television network I-24, with the motto 'Around the Clock, Around the World'. The series premiered July 17, 2002, on Bravo.

Cast and characters

Main
 Tim Matheson as anchorman Bill Dunne
 Scott Bairstow as producer Ethan Barnes
 Myndy Crist as reporter Janet LeClaire
 Vincent Gale as Quentin Druzinski
 Rowena King as reporter Jamie Templeton
 Jeffrey D. Sams as reporter Mel Thomas
 Lisa Ann Walter as senior/executive producer Rachel Glass
 Clancy Brown as news division president Peter Kozyck

Recurring
 Paul Adelstein as cameraman Julian Kerbis
 James Handy as Jack Barnes, independent stations owner, and Ethan Barnes' father
 Patricia Wettig as feature reporter Alison Dunne, and wife of Bill Dunne

Production
Breaking News was filmed in 2000 and 2001 at The Bridge Studios and Vancouver Film Studios in Vancouver, British Columbia. The series was originally developed for TNT, however they dropped the show before airing any of the 13 episodes, with the series ultimately airing on Bravo. TNT spent $20 million and nine months putting the series together.

Episodes

Reception
Manuel Mendoza of The Dallas Morning News rated the series a B− say that it "tries to do for journalism what The West Wing does for politics — make it sexy again". However, Mendoza goes on to say that the series "is not as snappily written or as heroically shot as The West Wing, but it has the same chaotic, frenetic energy". Preston Turegano of The San Diego Union-Tribune said the pilot episode is "predictable, familiar and mired with some cliches" before conceding that the show has "some original and humorous moments". Joanne Ostrow of The Denver Post called it a "smart, expensive, well-cast series", "even if it's an uneven effort".

References

External links

Bravo (American TV network) original programming
Television series about television
Television series by Warner Bros. Television Studios
2000s American drama television series
2002 American television series debuts
2002 American television series endings
Television series about journalism
Television shows filmed in Vancouver
English-language television shows
Television series by New Line Television